John Burnett (September 1781 – 10 July 1860) was the first Colonial Secretary of Van Diemen's Land.

Burnett served from March 1826 until 1835. Several scandals and maladministration characterised his tenure. He worked with Lieutenant Governor George Arthur in conducting the Vandemonian wars against the aboriginal population.

See also 
 Colonial Secretary of Van Diemen's Land

References

External links 

 Colonial Secretary's papers 1822-1877, State Library of Queensland- includes digitised correspondence, letters and notes written by Burnett to the Colonial Secretary of New South Wales

1781 births
1860 deaths
Colonial Secretaries of Tasmania
Tasmanian politicians
19th-century Australian politicians